Kevin Hertel (born May 1985) is an American politician serving as a member of the Michigan House of Representatives from the 18th district. Elected in 2016, he assumed office in January 2017.

Education 
Hertel attended Michigan State University, where he studied political science. Along with students from each of Michigan's 15 public universities, Hertel managed an effort to advocate for an increase in higher education funding. He continued to stay active in political campaigns and learned firsthand how government should work as an intern for former state Senator Deb Cherry.

Career 
Before serving in the House, Hertel worked for Blue Cross Blue Shield of Michigan as a legislative analyst and then as a special assistant in the office of the president. He is also involved in several community organizations. He is the son of former House Speaker Curtis Hertel, and the brother of State Senator Curtis Hertel Jr.

References

External links
 Campaign website

Democratic Party members of the Michigan House of Representatives
Democratic Party Michigan state senators
Michigan State University alumni
21st-century American politicians
1985 births
Living people